The Macchi M.40 was a prototype 1920s Italian catapult-launched reconnaissance floatplane designed and built by  Macchi, it did not enter production.

Design
The M.40 was an all-metal equal-span biplane powered by a  Fiat A.20 piston engine. It had a large central float with a stabilising float under each wing. The crew sat in tandem open cockpits and the M.40 was armed with one fixed and one movable  machine-gun.

Specifications

See also

References
Citations

Bibliography

M.39
1920s Italian military reconnaissance aircraft
Floatplanes
Biplanes
Single-engined tractor aircraft
Aircraft first flown in 1928